Eutreta latipennis is a species of tephritid or fruit flies in the genus Eutreta of the family Tephritidae.

Distribution
Neotropical.

References

Tephritinae
Insects described in 1843
Diptera of South America